Top Secret (一級秘密 (일급비밀)) is the first extended play from South Korean boy band UP10TION. It was released on September 11, 2015, by TOP Media. The album consists of six tracks, including the title track, "So, Dangerous".

Commercial performance
The EP sold 17,536+ copies in South Korea. It peaked at number 7 on the Korean Gaon Chart.

Track listing

References 

2015 EPs
Korean-language EPs
Kakao M EPs
Up10tion EPs